The Outsider is a 2019 American Western film directed by Timothy Woodward Jr. and starring Trace Adkins, Jon Foo, Sean Patrick Flanery, Kaiwi Lyman-Mersereau and Danny Trejo.

Cast
Jon Foo as Jing Phang
Trace Adkins as Marshal Walker
Sean Patrick Flanery as Chris King
Kaiwi Lyman-Mersereau as James Walker
Danny Trejo as Carlos

Reception
The website's critics consensus reads: "The Outsider may satisfy Western fans, but despite a winning performance from Country music legend Trace Adkins it's too predictable to really leave a mark."

References

External links
 
 

American Western (genre) films
2010s English-language films
Films directed by Timothy Woodward Jr.
2010s American films